Walter Butler may refer to:

 Walter Butler, 11th Earl of Ormond (1569–1632/3), British Army officer
 Walter Butler of Roscrea (c. 1600–1634), early seventeenth century Irish soldier of fortune and assassin of Wallenstein
 Walter Butler, 16th Earl of Ormonde (1703–1783)
 Walter Butler (Loyalist) (1752–1781), Loyalist during the American Revolution, son of John Butler
 Walter Butler, 1st Marquess of Ormonde (1770–1820), Irish peer and politician
 Walter S. Butler (1823–1913), political figure in New Brunswick
 Walter Halben Butler (1852–1931), US Representative from Iowa
 Walter Butler (architect) (1860–1949), Australian architect 
 Walter Butler (cricketer) (1882–1966), Australian cricketer
 Walter Butler (Australian politician) (1892–1937), New South Wales Legislative Assembly member for Hurstville
 W. E. Butler (1898–1978), occultist and esoteric author in Britain
 Walter Garth Butler (1923–1995), English footballer
 Walter Butler (French businessman), French/American businessman, head of Butler Capital Partners
 Sir Walter Butler, 1st Baronet (died 1650), Irish nobleman
 Walter B. Butler (1858–1933), owner of Walter Butler Shipbuilders Inc. in Superior, Wisconsin

See also
 Walter Butler Wilkinson (1781–1807), Canadian political figure
 Walter Butler Cheadle (1836–1910), English paediatrician